The following is a list of multi-purpose stadiums in Qatar, used primarily for association football. The minimum capacity is 1,000.

Former stadiums

References

Qatar
Football stadiums
Football stadiums